Praveen Morchhale is the winner of India's 65th National Film Awards 2017 as well as ICFT-UNESCO GANDHI Medal 2018 winner film director, producer and screenwriter, who works in Indian cinema. Morchhale is hailed by critics as an important filmmaker of the Indian new wave.

Films

Praveen Morchhale directed his first feature film Barefoot to Goa in 2015. Having started out by making short films and directing theatre, this film turned to crowdfunding prior to its release on 10 April 2015. Co-produced by 238 people who raised a sum of INR 5 million, this film depicted the indulgent relationship between a grandparent and a grandchild.

His next feature "Walking with the Wind" (2017), bagged three prizes at the 65th National Film Awards - Best Film (Ladakhi), Best Sound Design (Sanal George) and Best Re-Recording (Justin Jose). This film was also awarded the ICFT UNESCO Gandhi medal at the 49th International Film Festival of India.

Morchhale's third film, Widow of Silence (2018) is about a Kashmiri woman, Aasiya, whose husband gets picked up by the security forces. After waiting for seven years she is now a 'half-widow', a woman whose husband is missing, facing a government which is unwilling to declare him dead. This Urdu language feature was premiered at the 24th Kolkata International Film Festival on 12 November 2018 after debuting at the 23rd Busan International Film Festival where it was nominated for the Kim Jiseok Award for Best Asian Director.  Film later was screened at more than 35 prestigious film festivals around the world such as International Film Festival Rotterdam 2019, Gothenburg Film Festival 2019, Seattle International Film Festival 2019, Jerusalem Film Festival 2019 

Film won 5 International awards and considered as the most important film coming out from India in the year 2019. Film won Best film award at MOOOV Film Fest, 2019 Belgium (Winner Best film award in International competition and Behind the Scene Award).

At the 17th annual Indian Film Festival of Los Angeles, "Widow of Silence" won the Grand Jury prize for the best feature, for its depiction of "a condition that most of the world doesn't get to see".

Critical response 
Praveen's all three films have received critical response from all over the world. Widow of Silence has received positive reviews from critics and audiences alike.

The New York Times wrote that "“Widow of Silence” is a movie with a cool head and a sharp eye — one that sees greater hope in the flamboyantly jeweled tones of a carmine head scarf than in the entrenched absurdities of a broken bureaucracy.

The Hollywood Reporter wrote that the least compromised by sentimentality, it packs an unsettling message of empowerment very rare in the social injustice genre.

Roger Ebert.com has a highly praise for the film - "The final four minutes turn what was already a fine picture into an unforgettable one, affirming Morchhale's status as one of the most exciting figures of the Indian new wave."

Devarshi Ghosh wrote on Scroll.in that "Hope is a running theme in Morchhale's films". According to her, "In Widow of Silence, Aasiya's hope leads to a jarring poetic justice. “The end signifies not just the end of the villain but also of the system”".

Reviewing the film for the Asian Movie Pulse (AMP),  Joanna KOŃCZAK noted that "Morchhale has undoubtedly brought up important issues and gave the voice to the people of the Valley, dwelling on their suffering and sorrows without a preachy tone and exaggerated melodrama. It is very rare for Indian filmmakers to take on the Kashmiri case in such an emphatic and problem-focused manner."

Belgian distributor MOOOV has picked up Benelux rights from Oration Films to Praveen Morchhale's Kashmir-set Widow Of Silence. The deal for all rights excluding airlines marks the first for the film.

Inspiration

Morchhale has been noted for his subtle, natural and simplistic style of cinema and he mostly uses non-professional actors in his films. He takes his inspiration from Iranian Cinema, especially directors like Abbas Kiarostami whom he considers an "epitome of simple cinema...who uses the film medium to express stories in a minimalist way...without worrying too much about commercial aspects.".

Filmography

As Director and Writer

As producer

Awards and nominations

References

External links 
 Film review: Widow of Silence (2020) by The New York Times
 Film review: Widow of Silence (2020) by rogerebert.com
 Film Review by The Hollywood Reporter
 Film review: Widow of Silence (2018) by Praveen Morchhale On Asian Movie Pulse (AMP)
 

Living people
Hindi-language film directors
21st-century Indian film directors
1968 births
Film directors from Mumbai